Simalthu is a village in the Surat district of Gujarat, India. Simalthu is a village in the Surat district of Gujarat, India.

References

Villages in Surat district